Brolly may refer to:

People
 Anne Brolly, Sinn Féin politician and councillor on Limavady Borough Council in Northern Ireland
 Bob Brolly (born 1950), Northern Ireland-born broadcaster and singer
 Brian Brolly (1936–2006), English showbusiness entrepreneur
 Francie Brolly (born 1947), musician, retired teacher and republican politician from Dungiven, Northern Ireland
 Joe Brolly (born 1969), Irish barrister, Gaelic football analyst, and former player from Dungiven, County Londonderry, Northern Ireland
 Mike Brolly (born 1954), Scottish-born former professional footballer
 Sarah Buxton Brolly (born 1965), American actress
 Shane Brolly (born 1970), Northern Irish actor, writer, and director

Other uses
 Umbrella, colloquially
 Brolly, California, in Modoc County

See also
 Broly, fictional character in the Dragon Ball series